I Know That Voice is a documentary film about American voice acting. It premiered on November 6, 2013, at Grauman's Egyptian Theatre. The documentary was narrated by John DiMaggio, the voice of Bender on Futurama and Jake on Adventure Time, and stars DiMaggio and many other voice actors, including Billy West, Tara Strong, Tom Kenny, Grey DeLisle, June Foray, Rob Paulsen, Rachael MacFarlane, Mark Hamill, Ed Asner, Robin Atkin Downes, and Pamela Adlon.

Cast
The following voice actors, directors and staff were interviewed in the documentary:

 Charlie Adler
 Pamela Adlon
 Carlos Alazraqui
 Jack Angel
 Ed Asner
 Hank Azaria
 Diedrich Bader
 Dee Bradley Baker
 Eric Bauza
 Jeff Bennett
 Bob Bergen
 Gregg Berger
 Bob Birchard
 Noel Blanc
 Steve Blum
 Chris Borders
 Devon Bowman
 Justin Brinsfield
 Clancy Brown
 Corey Burton
 Nancy Cartwright
 David X. Cohen
 Kevin Connolly
 Kevin Conroy
 Matt Corey
 Jim Cummings
 E. G. Daily
 Grey DeLisle
 Debi Derryberry
 Jessica DiCicco
 John DiMaggio
 Robin Atkin Downes
 Mark Evanier
 Bill Farmer
 David Faustino
 Dave Filoni
 June Foray
 Pat Fraley
 Stan Freberg
 Nika Futterman
 Morgan Gerhard
 Frank Gladstone
 Seth Green
 Matt Groening
 Jennifer Hale
 Mark Hamill
 Jim Hanks
 Jess Harnell
 Peter Hastings
 David Herman
 Richard Steven Horvitz
 Gordon Hunt
 Danny Jacobs
 Tom Kane
 David Kaye
 Josh Keaton
 Tom Kenny
 Maurice LaMarche
 Phil LaMarr
 Meredith Layne
 Janet Waldo Lee
 Jeff Lenburg
 Rachael MacFarlane
 Jason Marsden
 Jeff "Swampy" Marsh
 Mona Marshall
 Chuck McCann
 Mary Elizabeth McGlynn
 Tom McGrath
 Ginny McSwain
 Jim Meskimen
 Breckin Meyer
 Kate Miller
 Laraine Newman
 Daran Norris
 Nolan North
 Colleen O'Shaughnessey
 Gary Owens
 Rob Paulsen
 Don Pitts
 Dan Povenmire
 Kevin Michael Richardson
 Andrea Romano
 Stephen Root
 Marion Ross
 Lisa Schaffer
 Dana Snyder
 Kath Soucie
 Tara Strong
 Cree Summer
 Lee Supercinski
 James Arnold Taylor
 Fred Tatasciore
 Jamie Thomason
 Lauren Tom
 Alanna Ubach
 Kari Wahlgren
 Jim Ward
 Pendleton Ward
 Billy West
 Gary Anthony Williams
 Wally Wingert
 Cedric Yarbrough
 Kris Zimmerman

Production
DiMaggio noted that he had logged 150 interviews and over 160 hours of film.

Documentary series
A documentary series with the same title is being developed with segments featuring different voice actors. It was planned to be released in 2020 but it fell through. It will continue to work through the interviews from the film.

Accolades
Director Lawrence Shapiro won the Certificate of Merit at the 42nd Annie Awards.

References

External links
 

Documentary films about fandom
2013 documentary films
2013 films
American documentary films
Documentary films about actors
Voice acting
Animation fandom
2010s English-language films
2010s American films